Truluck is a surname. Notable people with the surname include:

Ashley Truluck, British soldier and administrator
Bob Truluck (born 1949), American novelist
R-Kal Truluck (1974–2019), American football player
Rembert S. Truluck (1934–2008), American gay theologian, preacher, and writer